Świdnik may refer to the following places in Poland:
Świdnik, a town in Lublin Voivodeship (east Poland)
Świdnik County, Lublin Voivodeship
Świdnik, Lower Silesian Voivodeship a village (south-west Poland)
Świdnik, Limanowa County in Lesser Poland Voivodeship (south Poland)
Świdnik, Nowy Sącz County in Lesser Poland Voivodeship (south Poland)

See also
 Svidník, a town in eastern Slovakia
 Svidník District, Slovakia
 Świdnica, Lower Silesian Voivodeship, a city in south-west Poland
 Świdnica County, Lower Silesian Voivodeship
 Świdnica, Lubusz Voivodeship, a village